Brettabister is a settlement on the island of Mainland in Shetland, Scotland. It is in the parish of Nesting. St. Ola's parish church lies to the east, near Houstabister. The war memorial for North Nesting parish is at the centre of Brettabister, adjacent to the B9075 road, opposite the junction with the road to Neap.

References

External links

Canmore - Bretabister site record
Shetland Museum Archives - Brettabister School

Villages in Mainland, Shetland